Kenneth John Thompson (born 1 March 1945) was an English professional footballer who played as a half-back in the Football League for Ipswich Town and Exeter City, and in non-League football for Yeovil Town.

References

1945 births
Living people
Footballers from Suffolk
Sportspeople from Ipswich
English footballers
Association football midfielders
Ipswich Town F.C. players
Exeter City F.C. players
Yeovil Town F.C. players
English Football League players